The carrion crow (Corvus corone) is a passerine bird of the family Corvidae and the genus Corvus which is native to western Europe and the eastern Palearctic.

Taxonomy and systematics
The carrion crow was one of the many species originally described by Carl Linnaeus in his landmark 1758 10th edition of Systema Naturae, and it still bears its original name of Corvus corone. The binomial name is derived from the Latin , "raven", and Greek  , "crow".

The hooded crow, formerly regarded as a subspecies, has been split off as a separate species, and there is some discussion whether the eastern carrion crow (C. c. orientalis) is distinct enough to warrant specific status; the two taxa are well separated, and it has been proposed they could have evolved independently in the wetter, maritime regions at the opposite ends of the Eurasian landmass.

Along with the hooded crow, the carrion crow occupies a similar ecological niche in Eurasia to the American crow (C. brachyrhynchos) in North America.

Description

The plumage of the carrion crow is black with a green or purple sheen, much greener than the gloss of the rook. The bill, legs and feet are also black.

There is frequent confusion between the carrion crow and the rook, another black corvid found within its range. The beak of the crow is stouter and in consequence looks shorter, and whereas in the adult rook the nostrils are bare, those of the crow are covered at all ages with bristle-like feathers. As well as this, the wings of a carrion crow are proportionally shorter and broader than those of the rook when seen in flight.

Juvenile carrion crows can be identified by their brownish plumage and blue eyes, both of which darken to black and brown as the crow grows older.

Distribution and genetic relationship to hooded crows

The carrion crow (Corvus corone) and hooded crow (Corvus cornix), including the former's slightly larger allied form or race C. c. orientalis, are two very closely related species; the geographic distributions of both forms of carrion crow across Europe are illustrated in the accompanying diagram. It is believed that this distribution might have resulted from the glaciation cycles during the Pleistocene, which caused the parent population to split into isolates which subsequently re-expanded their ranges when the climate warmed causing secondary contact.

Poelstra and coworkers sequenced almost the entire genomes of both species in populations at varying distances from the contact zone to find that the two species were genetically identical, both in their DNA and in its expression (in the form of mRNA), except for the lack of expression of a small portion (<0.28%) of the genome (situated on avian chromosome 18) in the hooded crow, which imparts the lighter plumage colouration on its torso. Thus the two species can viably hybridize, and occasionally do so at the contact zone, but the all-black carrion crows on the one side of the contact zone mate almost exclusively with other all-black carrion crows, while the same occurs among the hooded crows on the other side of the contact zone.

It is therefore clear that it is only the outward appearance of the two species that inhibits hybridization. The authors attribute this to assortative mating (rather than to ecological selection), the advantage of which is not clear, and it would lead to the rapid appearance of streams of new lineages, and possibly even species, through mutual attraction between mutants. Unnikrishnan and Akhila propose, instead, that koinophilia is a more parsimonious explanation for the resistance to hybridization across the contact zone, despite the absence of physiological, anatomical or genetic barriers to such hybridization. The carrion crow is also found in the mountains and forests of Japan and also in the cities of Japan.

Behaviour and ecology

The rook is generally gregarious and the crow largely solitary, but rooks occasionally nest in isolated trees, and crows may feed with rooks; moreover, crows are often sociable in winter roosts. The most distinctive feature is the voice. The rook has a high-pitched kaaa, but the crow's guttural, slightly vibrant, deeper croaked kraa is distinct from any note of the rook.

The carrion crow is noisy, perching on a vantage point such as a building or the top of a tree and calling three or four times in quick succession, with a slight pause between each series of croaks. During each series of calls, a crow may perform an accompanying gesture, raising its shoulders and bowing its head and neck downwards with each caw. The wing-beats are slower, more deliberate than those of the rook.

Carrion crows can become tame near humans, and can often be found near areas of human activity or habitation including cities, moors, woodland, sea cliffs and farmland where they compete with other social birds such as gulls, other corvids, and ducks for food in parks and gardens.

Like other species of corvid, carrion crows will actively harass predators and competitors that enter their territory or threaten them or their offspring, and will engage in group mobbing behaviour as a method to defend themselves.

Intelligence 
Like all corvids, carrion crows are very intelligent. For example, they can discriminate between numerosities up to 30, flexibly switch between rules, and recognise human and crow faces. Given the difference in brain architecture in crows compared to primates, these abilities suggest that their intelligence is realised as a product of convergent evolution.

Diet
Though an eater of carrion of all kinds, the carrion crow will eat insects, earthworms, other invertebrates, grain, fruits, seeds, nuts, small mammals, amphibians, fish, scraps and will also steal eggs. Crows are scavengers by nature, which is why they tend to frequent sites inhabited by humans in order to feed on their household waste. Crows will also harass birds of prey or even foxes for their kills. Crows actively hunt and occasionally co-operate with other crows to make kills, and are sometimes seen catching ducklings for food. Due to their gregarious lifestyle and defensive abilities, carrion crows have few natural predators. However, powerful raptors such as the northern goshawk, peregrine falcon, Eurasian eagle-owl and golden eagle will readily hunt them, and crows can become an important prey item locally.

Nesting

The bulky stick nest is usually placed in a tall tree, but cliff ledges, old buildings and pylons may be used as well. Nests are also occasionally placed on or near the ground. The nest resembles that of the common raven, but is less bulky. The 3 to 4 brown-speckled blue or greenish eggs are incubated for 18–20 days by the female alone, who is fed by the male. The young fledge after 29–30 days.

It is not uncommon for an offspring from the previous years to stay around and help rear the new hatchlings. Instead of seeking out a mate, it looks for food and assists the parents in feeding the young.

References

External links

Photo of profile.
Image of the skull.
Ageing and sexing (PDF; 3.4 MB) by Javier Blasco-Zumeta & Gerd-Michael Heinze.
HOME of the corvus corone corone.

carrion crow
carrion crow
Birds of Eurasia
Birds of Japan
carrion crow
carrion crow